The Czech and Slovak languages form the  Czech–Slovak (or Czecho-Slovak) subgroup within the West Slavic languages.

Most varieties of Czech and Slovak are mutually intelligible, forming a dialect continuum (spanning the intermediate Moravian dialects) rather than being two clearly distinct languages; standardised forms of these two languages are, however, easily distinguishable and recognizable because of disparate vocabulary, orthography, pronunciation, phonology, suffixes and prefixes. The eastern Slovak dialects are more divergent and form a broader dialect continuum with the Lechitic subgroup of West Slavic, most notably Polish.

The name "Czechoslovak language" is mostly reserved for an official written standard intended to unify Czech and Slovak created in the 19th century (but to a greater extent based on Czech rather than Slovak).

History

The early Slavic expansion reached Central Europe in the 7th century, and the West Slavic dialects diverged from common Slavic over the following centuries. The West Slavic tribes settled on the eastern fringes of the Carolingian Empire, along the Limes Saxoniae. Prior to the Magyar invasion of Pannonia in the 890s, the West Slavic polity of Great Moravia spanned much of Central Europe between what is now Eastern Germany and Western Romania. In the high medieval period, the West Slavic tribes were again pushed to the east by the incipient German Ostsiedlung, decisively so following the Wendish Crusade in the 11th century.

West Slavic as a group distinct from common Slavic thus emerges during the 7th to 9th centuries. 
The Czech-Slovak in turn develops as a separate dialect continuum within West Slavic during roughly the 10th to 12th centuries, just predating the first written attestation of the language in the 13th to 14th centuries. The diversification of West Slavic had the characteristic of a dialect continuum. For example, the spirantisation of Slavic /g/ to /h/ is an areal feature shared by the Czech-Slovak group with both Ukrainian and Sorbian (but not with Polish). This innovation appears to have travelled from east to west, and is sometimes attributed to contact with Scytho-Sarmatian.  It is approximately dated to the 12th century in Slovak, the 12th to 13th century in Czech and the 14th century in Upper Sorbian.

The Bohemian state was incorporated as the Kingdom of Bohemia in the 13th century. The Slovaks, on the other hand, never became part of the Holy Roman Empire in the medieval period, being incorporated into the Kingdom of Hungary. 
For this reason, the history of the closely related Czech and Slovak peoples took a significantly different course during the later medieval period, the Czechs being associated with the Holy Roman Empire and the Slovaks being affected by the history of Eastern Europe (the history of Hungary and the Mongol invasion). In the 16th century, however, they were once again united under   Habsburg rule, and after the fall of the Habsburg monarchy sharing their own country of Czechoslovakia during 1918–1992.

In the modern period, the spoken language of Bohemia became influenced by the written standard and developed into Common Czech, largely effacing dialectal variation within Bohemia. 
By contrast, Moravia remained dialectally diverse, with a series of variants intermediate between Czech and Slovak, and are thus sometimes viewed as dialects of Slovak rather than Czech.
The Czech–Slovak group was summarized under the term "Bohemian–Moravian–Slovak" in the Austrian census of Cisleithania beginning in the 1880s.

The Czechoslovak language was an attempt to create a single written standard, first proposed during the national revival in the 1830s and the official language of the First Czechoslovak Republic from 1920–1938.

In television and radio, Czech and Slovak were used in equal ratios. Since the dissolution of Czechoslovakia in 1993, the Czech and Slovak written standards have been the official languages of the Czech Republic and Slovakia, respectively.

Beginning in the 1990s, a political movement of Moravian linguistic separatism has developed.
 On the occasion of 2011 Census of the Czech Republic, several Moravian organizations (Moravané and Moravian National Community among others) led a campaign to promote the Moravian nationality and language. The 2011 census recorded 62,908 native speakers of Moravian.

Varieties
The Czech-Slovak dialect continuum historically blended into Silesian in the west and Old Ruthenian (also known as Chancery Slavonic) in the east. With the development of the written standards in the 19th century, it has become less diversified, but there remains a pronounced dialectal division in Moravia. 
The southeastern Moravian dialects, in particular, are sometimes considered dialects of Slovak rather than Czech, e.g.  using the same declension patterns for nouns and pronouns and the same verb conjugations as Slovak.

Czech language: since the later 20th century largely standardised, dialectal use is now mostly restricted to older speakers) Common Czech (obecná čeština) is the main vernacular based on the dialect of the Prague region.
Nářečí středočeská (Central Bohemian dialects)
Nářečí jihozápadočeská (Southwestern Bohemian dialects)
Podskupina chodská (Chod subgroup)
Podskupina doudlebská (Doudleby subgroup)
Nářečí severovýchodočeská (Northeastern Bohemian dialects)
Podskupina podkrknošská (Krkonoše subgroup)
Teták (Litomyšl) †
Moravian dialects  (moravština)
Bohemian-Moravian (Nářečí českomoravská, transitional to Bohemian Czech)
Central Moravian (Hanakian, Nářečí středomoravská)
Podskupina tišnovská (Tišnov subgroup)
Lach/Silesian (Nářečí slezská, transitional Silesian)
Eastern Moravian (Moravian-Slovak, Nářečí východomoravská, transitional to Slovak)
Podskupina slovácká (Moravian Slovak subgroup)
Podskupina valašská (Moravian Wallachian subgroup)
 Knaanic language (Judeo-Czech) †
Slovak language
Western Slovak dialects (in   Kysuce, Trenčín, Trnava, Nitra, Záhorie)
Central Slovak dialects (in Liptov, Orava, Turiec, Tekov, Hont, Novohrad, Gemer and the historic Zvolen county)
Lowland (dolnozemské) Slovak dialects (outside Slovakia in the Pannonian Plain in Serbian Vojvodina, and in southeastern Hungary, western Romania, and the Croatian part of Syrmia)
Eastern Slovak dialects (in Spiš, Šariš, Zemplín and Abov, transitional to Ruthenian)

In a 1964 textbook on Czech dialectology, Břetislav Koudela used the sentence "Put the flour from the mill in the cart" to highlight phonetic differences between dialects:

Comparison of written standards

The following comparison concerns the contemporary written standards:

Orthography
Slovak graphemes that do not exist in Czech are: ä, ľ, ĺ, ŕ, ô. Czech graphemes that do not exist in Slovak are: ě, ř and ů (see Pronunciation for Czech language and Pronunciation for Slovak language).

Phonology
Slovak, unlike Czech, uses palatal consonants more frequently (that is, is phonetically "softer"), but there are some exceptions. Slovak de, te, ne are usually pronounced as the Czech dě, tě, ně. 
The "rhythmic law" in Slovak prohibits two adjacent long syllables.

Grammar
Slovak grammar is somewhat more regular than the grammar of literary Czech, since present-day standard Slovak was not codified until the 19th century.
The two languages have differences in declension and conjugation endings and paradigms (e.g. Slovak -cia, -ej, -dlo, -ť, -ov, -om, -mi – Czech , -é, -t, -ů, -em, y).
Slovak does not commonly use the vocative case, while the Czech vocative is still very much alive.
Slovak uses the passive voice formed as in English less than Czech, and prefers the passive voice formed using the reflexive pronoun sa (as in East Slavic languages) instead.

Lexicon
Lexical differences are mostly of simple historical origin. As for professional terminology, except for biology (esp. all names of animals and plants), the Czech terminology was mostly taken over (in Slovakised form) for practical reasons. The Czech-Slovak Dictionary of Different Terms (1989, Prague) contains some 11,000 entries (without professional terminology):

Examples of words with different meanings : SK topiť (to melt/to drown) (could be same meanings, depends on region) – CZ topit (to heat/to drown), SK kúriť (to heat) – CZ kouřit (to smoke), SK horký (bitter) – CZ horký (hot) but hořký (bitter), SK stávka (stake, bet)  – CZ stávka (strike), SK chudý (slim, skinny)  – CZ chudý (poor; metaphorically also slim), SK kapusta (cabbage)  – CZ kapusta (Savoy cabbage), SK pivnica (cellar)  – CZ pivnice (pub), SK syrový (cheesy, of cheese)  – CZ syrový (raw, uncooked) but sýrový (of cheese), SK spraviť (to make, to create)  – CZ spravit (to repair, to fix).
Czech months are of Slavic origin (e.g. říjen), whereas the Slovak months are of Latin origin (e.g. október).

Although most words are in fact different, they are largely similar, being cognates, which makes both languages mutually intelligible to a significant extent; e.g. foreign (SK cudzí – CZ cizí), reason (SK dôvod – CZ důvod), to want (SK chcieť – CZ chtít), to promise (SK sľubovať  – CZ slibovat), if (SK keby – CZ kdyby), river (SK rieka – CZ řeka), church (SK kostol – CZ kostel), wedding (SK svadobný – CZ svatební), who (SK kto – CZ kdo),  to ask (SK spýtať sa – CZ zeptat se), to fail (SK zlyhať – CZ selhat), almost (SK takmer – CZ téměř), thanks (SK ďakujem, vďaka – CZ děkuju, díky).

Example text
Article 1 of the Universal Declaration of Human Rights in Slovak:
 Všetci ľudia sa rodia slobodní a rovní v dôstojnosti aj právach. Sú obdarení rozumom a svedomím a majú sa k sebe správať v duchu bratstva.

Article 1 of the Universal Declaration of Human Rights in Czech (adjusted to Slovak translation):
Všichni lidé se rodí svobodní a rovní v důstojnosti i právech. Jsou obdařeni rozumem a svědomím a mají se k sobě chovat v duchu bratrství.

Article 1 of the Universal Declaration of Human Rights in English:
All human beings are born free and equal in dignity and rights. They are endowed with reason and conscience and should act towards one another in a spirit of brotherhood.

See also
West Slavic languages
History of the Czech language
History of the Slovak language
Czechoslovak language

References

Bibliography

External links

Czech language
Differences between Slovak and Czech languages
Slovak and Czech languages